Keith Cox (30 August 1903 – 8 November 1977) was a New Zealand cricketer. He played one first-class match for Otago in 1933/34.

Cox was born at Marton and was educated at Christ's College, Christchurch. He worked as a company secretary.

References

External links
 

1903 births
1977 deaths
New Zealand cricketers
Otago cricketers
People from Marton, New Zealand